Frederick of Württemberg-Neuenstadt (19 December 1615, in Stuttgart – 24 March 1682, in Neuenstadt am Kocher) was Duke of Württemberg and founder of the second branch line Duchy of Württemberg-Neuenstadt.

Life  
Frederick was the third son of Johann Frederick, the 7th Duke of Württemberg and Barbara Sophie of Brandenburg. When his father died in 1628, his elder brother became Eberhard III, Duke of Württemberg.

Frederick went at the age of 13 to study in Tübingen. In 1630 he went on a Grand Tour via Strasbourg, Basel and Montpellier but broke it off in Lyon due to severe fever.

In 1638, his brother Eberhard III was given back certain parts of the lost duchy of Württemberg by Ferdinand III, Holy Roman Emperor while Frederick was drawn into war service. After the Peace of Westphalia, which led to the full restoration of Württemberg, Eberhard entered into a Fürstbrüderlicher Vergleich – a mutual agreement made between ducal brothers. Duke Eberhard III left his brother Frederick possession of Neuenstadt, Möckmühl and Weinsberg, although this was without sovereignty which remained with Eberhard.

Frederick restored Neuenstadt castle after it suffered damage in the Thirty Years' War and took up residence there in 1652. On 7 June 1653 he married Clara Augusta, daughter of Augustus the Younger of Brunswick.

The couple had 12 children.

 Frederick Augustus (1654–1716)
 Ulrich (1655–1655)
 Eberhard (1656–1656)
 Albrecht (1657–1670)
 Sophie Dorothea (1658–1681)
 Ferdinand Wilhelm (1659–1701)
 Anton Ulrich (1661–1680)
 Barbara Auguste (1663–1664)
 Eleonore Charlotte (1664–1666)
 Christoph (1666)
 Carl Rudolf (1667–1742)
 Anna Eleonore (1669–1670)

Duke Frederick died after a long illness on 24 March 1682 and was buried in Neuenstadt church. He was succeeded by his eldest son, Frederick August.

Ancestry

Bibliography 
  Harald Schukraft: Kleine Geschichte des Hauses Württemberg. Silberburg Publishing, Tübingen, 2006,

References 
 German archives: page from ADB  
 Family crypt in Neuenstadt  

1615 births
1682 deaths
17th-century dukes of Württemberg
Nobility from Stuttgart